Poison'd!  is the seventh and most recent studio album by American glam metal band Poison, released June 5, 2007. The 14-track album features recordings of Poison's favorite rock classics. Nine new tracks and five previously released covers make up the album.

Release and promotion
The first single to be released from the album was a cover of the Romantics' "What I Like About You" which also featured a music video from the band.

The album entered the Billboard 200 chart at #32, selling 21,000 copies in its first week. The album also charted at #12 on the Top Rock Albums chart A concert from the supporting tour was featured on the Poison DVD  "Live, Raw & Uncut", which was the band's next release.

Song information
On January 3, 2007, Poison announced on their official Myspace page that they would like their fans to help pick favourite classic rock songs for the new studio album that they are to record. The fans replied with suggestions like Lynyrd Skynyrd's "Freebird", Sweet's "The Ballroom Blitz", and AC/DC's "You Shook Me All Night Long", along with what might be an obvious choice - Alice Cooper's "Poison". On January 28, Rikki Rockett explained,

Singles
"What I Like About You"

Bonus track
The Wal-Mart version of Poison'd! exclusively features the bonus track "SexyBack" originally performed by Justin Timberlake.

It was later released as a digital single in the iTunes Store.

Covers not included
The only Poison cover songs not included as bonus tracks are "The Cover of the Rolling Stone" (Dr. Hook & the Medicine Show cover) from Crack a Smile...and More!, and "God Save the Queen", an instrumental Sex Pistols cover from the Open Up and Say... Ahh! sessions (which was released on the 20th anniversary edition of Flesh & Blood).

Track listing

Producers
Tracks 1 - 8 + 14: produced by Don Was – 2007 (new recordings)
Track 9: produced by Rick Rubin, soundtrack of the film Less than Zero – 1987
Track 10: produced by Thom Panunzio, Hollyweird – 2002
Track 11: produced by Ric Browde - 1987; bonus track on Look What the Cat Dragged In - 20th Anniversary Edition – 2006
Track 12: produced by Tom Werman, Open Up and Say...Ahh! – 1988
Track 13: produced by Don Was, The Best of Poison: 20 Years of Rock – 2006

Credits
 Bret Michaels – lead vocals,
 C.C. DeVille – lead guitar, backing vocals
 Bobby Dall – bass, backing vocals
 Rikki Rockett – drums, backing vocals

Additional musicians
Jim McGorman – keyboards, backing vocals

Charts

References

External links
Official website

Albums produced by Don Was
2007 albums
Covers albums
Poison (American band) albums